The archaeological park of Ahouakro is located in northern Tiassalé Department, Côte d'Ivoire.

Site Description 
The Archaeological Park houses many magmatic megaliths, or large rock formations, that the local people have personified with human characters. Archaeological finds in the park include stone sharpening tools and Neolithic period rock art.

World Heritage Status 
This site was added to the UNESCO World Heritage Tentative List on November 29, 2006, in the Mixed (Cultural & Natural) category.

Notes

References 
Parc archéologique d'Ahouakro - UNESCO World Heritage Centre Accessed 2009-02-24.

World Heritage Sites in Ivory Coast
Agnéby-Tiassa
Archaeological parks